Husum is an unincorporated community in the White Salmon River Valley in the state of Washington.

Under the bridge in Husum, Washington, just miles from Hood River, Oregon and the scenic Columbia Gorge, Husum Falls is a vertical  Class V waterfall.

References

Unincorporated communities in Klickitat County, Washington
Unincorporated communities in Washington (state)